The Upper Room were a rock band based in Brighton, England. Sony Records were brought to the band's studio via mutual friends and they were signed in time for their first single, "All Over This Town", in summer 2004. The single's 2006 video featured actress Kate Sissons, who also appears in the video for their second major single release, "Black and White" (in April 2006). The band's only album Other People's Problems was released in May 2006. It was recorded in Dairy Studios, Brixton, with Paul Schroeder, who previously worked with The Stone Roses.

Initially they toured the UK with Hope of the States, The Electric Soft Parade, Bell X1, Longview, El Presidente and Rooster amongst others. In 2006 they headlined a 15-date tour of the UK between 24 April and 19 May, and were also booked for the Isle of Wight and V Festivals.

Front man Alex Miller posted a MySpace bulletin on 15 November 2006 announcing the band's split. It read: 

"...as there is quite a lot of misinformation going around at the moment, I am writing this message to clear up a few things.  People have been guessing (and guessing wrongly) what the next move will be for the band and its members.  I've had a great time over the last couple of years in The Upper Room and I will always remain good friends with Jim, Jon and Beau.  However, after recently splitting from our record label I feel it is time for me to move on."

In January 2008, Alexander Miller announced the birth of his new band: Voxpop. (www.myspace.com/voxpoplondon)

Discography

Albums
2006: Other People's Problems - UK #50

Singles

External links
MySpace

English rock music groups
Musical groups from Brighton and Hove